William F. Cronin, Jr. (November 20, 1943 – November 5, 1991) was an American football tight end who played one season with the Miami Dolphins of the American Football League (AFL). He was drafted by the Oakland Raiders in the fifteenth round of the 1965 AFL Draft. He played college football at Boston College. Cronin was also a member of the Philadelphia Eagles of the National Football League (NFL).

College career
Cronin played college football for the Boston College Eagles and was a team captain.

Professional career
Cronin was selected by the Oakland Raiders of the AFL with the 115th pick in the 1965 AFL Draft. He signed with the Philadelphia Eagles of the NFL in 1965 and spent most of the season on the taxi squad. He played for the AFL's Miami Dolphins in 1966.

Officiating career
Cronin became a football official after his playing career. He was selected to officiate eight postseason games, including the 1991 Hall of Fame Bowl, the 1989 Sugar Bowl and the 1987 Cotton Bowl. The NFL had asked him to submit an application in 1987 but he did not do so until January 1991 due to the birth of a child.

Death
He died of a heart attack on November 5, 1991 at his home in Westmont, New Jersey.

Personal life
Cronin's father Bill and uncle Jack also played football.

Cronin had three children from his first marriage and a fourth, Micheal P. Cronin, from his second marriage.

References

External links
Just Sports Stats

1943 births
1991 deaths
Players of American football from Massachusetts
American football tight ends
Boston College Eagles football players
Philadelphia Eagles players
Miami Dolphins players
Sportspeople from Lawrence, Massachusetts
American Football League players